Maksud Alikhanov-Avarsky (Russian language: Максуд Алиханов-Аварский) (in some documents his name is spelled as Alexander Mikhailovich) (1846-1907) - Russian Lieutenant-General (April 22, 1907), Merv District Head and Tiflis Governor. The elder brother of Kaitmaz Alikhanov.

Biography 
Born on November 23, 1846 in the village of Khunzakh in Dagestan, in the family of an Avar officer. As a child, he was held hostage by Shamil, after the ransom was determined in the 2nd Tiflis noble school. He reportedly carried the name Ali Khan Avarski.

His governance in the Caucasus was controversial and characterized as repressive.

He was subjected to an assassination attempt in 1906.

He was assassinated in 1907. The New York Times reports the date of the assassination as July 16.

Awards 
 Order of St. George (1877) 
 Order of St. Vladimir (1872, 1899)
 Order of St. Anna (1888, 1906)
 Order of St. Stanislaus (1904)
 Imperial Order of the Lion and the Sun (Persia) (1884, 1900 & 1902)
 Order of the Golden Star of Bukhara (1895)

Selected works of Alikhanov-Avarsky 
 Mervsky oasis and roads leading to it. St Petersburg, 1883
 Visiting the Shah. Essays on Persia. Tiflis, 1898
 Hike in Khiva (Caucasian troops). Steppe and oasis. St Petersburg, 1899
 Tarihi Derbend-Nama. Tiflis, 1898.
 Author of numerous illustrations, articles and reports in periodicals.

Bibliography

References 

1846 births
1907 deaths
Russian military leaders
Military writers from the Russian Empire
Recipients of the Order of St. George
Recipients of the Order of St. Vladimir
Recipients of the Order of St. Anna
Recipients of the Order of St. George of the Fourth Degree
19th-century military personnel from the Russian Empire